Bruno Duvergé (born 3 April 1957) is a French politician representing the Democratic Movement. He was elected to the French National Assembly on 18 June 2017, representing the department of Pas-de-Calais.

References

Living people
1957 births
Emlyon Business School alumni
Deputies of the 15th National Assembly of the French Fifth Republic
Democratic Movement (France) politicians
Members of Parliament for Pas-de-Calais